Holy Family Catholic School may refer to:

In Australia:
 Holy Family Catholic School (South Australia)

In the United Kingdom:
Holy Family Catholic School, Keighley
Holy Family Catholic School, Walthamstow

In the United States:
 Holy Family Catholic Schools System in Dubuque, Iowa
 Holy Family Catholic School (Austin, Texas)

See also
 Holy Family Catholic High School (disambiguation)